The Mahatma Gandhi Institute of Education for Peace and Sustainable Development (MGIEP) situated in New Delhi, India was established with the support of the Government of India. It is the first of its kind Research Institute of UNESCO in the Asia Pacific. Which focuses on achieving the Sustainable Development Goal  towards education for peace, sustainable development and global citizenship to foster peaceful and sustainable societies. The Institute is guided by its vision of ‘transforming education for humanity’.

In 2009, the UNESCO General Conference decided to set up an institute focused on education for peace and sustainable development in the vast and rapidly growing Asia-Pacific region. In 2012, the former Director-General of UNESCO, Irina Bokova, and the former President of India, Pranab Mukherjee, launched this Institute. Initially, a two-member team operated out of the UNESCO office in New Delhi. Over time, the team has expanded to over 35 members and works out of its independent office in central New Delhi. The Director of the Institute is Dr Anantha Kumar Duraiappah.

Approach 
UNESCO MGIEP's initiatives are designed to mainstream social and emotional learning in education systems (K-12), innovate digital pedagogies and to put youth (18 – 34 years of age) as global citizens at the centre of the 2030 agenda for sustainable development in order to achieve SDG 4.7.

Focus Areas

K-12 students 
Cognitive neuroscience research has shown that a significant part of our learning occurs due to a neurobiological process called ‘neuroplasticity’, which is the capacity of the brain to rewire in response to the environment. Neuroplasticity happens the fastest from birth to the age of 24. The Institute works on the premise that education needs to include the learning of social and emotional skills through which individuals recognize and regulate emotions, identify a positive purpose, demonstrate empathy for others, take constructive action to promote human flourishing. Towards this, the Institute has developed a range of K-12 courses available on its indigenously designed learning platform, FramerSpace.

Courses for K-12 students include Climate Change, and Global Citizenship

Youth (18-34 years old) 
The Institute recognizes the youth as capable agents of change, social transformation, peace and sustainable development. In order to harness this potential, the Institute’s work with the youth aims to extend social and emotional learning beyond the four walls of the classroom and strives to empower the youth in social and emotional learning based on the latest research in the neuroscience of learning. The goal is to enable young people to transform non-formal, informal and formal education systems through innovative digital pedagogies, inter-generational dialogues and youth-led policy briefs and publications.

Courses for youth: Self-directed Emotional Learning for Empathy and Kindness (SEEK)

Other Initiatives: #KindnessMatters for Sustainable Development Goals, Prevention of Violent Extremism through Education, Talking Across Generations on Education

Teachers 
Through a series of capacity-building workshops for youth and community education stakeholders (including policymakers) and teachers, UNESCO MGIEP trains and empowers teachers, educators and young community leaders with the skills and tools to implement community-wide activities to mobilize their respective schools and communities towards long-lasting peace and sustainability.

Courses: The Digital Teacher

Policy Interventions 
The Institute proposes key recommendations for policymakers, guided by its research and work with stakeholders.

Products

FramerSpace 
FramerSpace is UNESCO MGIEP's indigenously designed co-creation platform designed for teachers, students and creators that provides building blocks to support the creation of online courses and connects learners to peers and creators through Artificial Intelligence. The platform is GDPR compliant.

Flagship Events

World Youth Conference on Kindness 
Inspired by Mahatma Gandhi, in commemoration of his 150th birth anniversary celebration, the first World Youth Conference on Kindness was introduced in 2019 to provide young people with a global platform where they could actively engage with decision-makers towards finding innovative ways of propagating non-violence as a way to resolve conflicts. The first World Youth Conference was held in New Delhi, India and inaugurated by the President of India, Shri Ram Nath Kovind. On October 24 and 25, 2020, UNESCO MGIEP and global partners hosted the 2nd World Youth Conference on Kindness centred on the theme Kindness for Peaceful and Sustainable Co-existence, to celebrate the 75th anniversary of the UN and to re-affirm the central role of empathy, compassion, and kindness to achieve the SDGs.

TECH 
The Transforming Education Conference For Humanity is the Institute's flagship conference focused on digital pedagogies for building peaceful and sustainable societies. The Conference was launched in 2017 and was held in Visakhapatnam City, State of Andhra Pradesh, India for 3 years, after which it was held virtually in 2020.

TAGe 
Driven by the inherent belief that any strategy aimed at the youth cannot be successful without empowering the youth, thereby encouraging them to speak up, the TAGe is a youth-driven intergenerational dialogue on education that provides a non-hierarchical platform to the youth to interact, discuss and debate critical issues that concern the future, with policymakers. Freire (1970) stated that human nature is dialogic and that communication has a leading role in our life, especially in transforming oppressive, hegemonic structures. TAGe is Freirean in that it is premised on the centrality of the transformative nature of dialogue. Premised on this centrality of dialogue for societal transformation with a temporal twist – ‘across generations’, this  platform brings together selected and highly-qualified youth representatives in a face-to-face flat dialogue on education with senior decision-makers on issues of common concern.

Distinguished Lecture Series 
Distinguished Lecture Series invites speakers of global eminence from among the world’s leading intellectuals and policymakers to spark transformative ideas for our shared future. In a world of unprecedented complexity, interdependence and opportunity to talk across boundaries, the discourse for the future will have to be led by the world’s brightest minds in dialogue with youth. These Lectures are expected to inspire a larger international dialogue on a more peaceful and sustainable world, built through better education, inclusive spaces, and global citizenship. In the past, Distinguished Lectures have been held in India and France. Past lecturers have included Prof. Richard Davidson, William James and Vilas Research Professor of Psychology and Psychiatry and Founder & Director of the Center for Healthy Minds, University of Wisconsin-Madison, Sadhguru in discussion with Gregoire Borst, Professor of Developmental Psychology and Cognitive Neuroscience of Education, LaPsyDE, Three-time Nobel Peace Prize Nominee, founder of the Oxford Research Group, Peace Direct, Rising Women Rising World and recipient of Niwanao Peace Prize, Dr Scilla Elworthy, Sir Partha Dasgupta, an economist and social scientist of international fame as well as founder of the innovative ‘Hole in the Wall’ and ‘School in the Cloud’ projects, and one of the most influential names in modern education, Dr. Sugata Mitra.

Flagship Publications

The Blue DOT 
THE BLUE DOT features articles showcasing UNESCO MGIEP’s activities and areas of interest. The magazine’s overarching theme is the relationship between education, peace, sustainable development and global citizenship. THE BLUE DOT’s role is to engage with readers on these issues in a fun and interactive manner. The magazine is designed to address audiences across generations and walks of life, thereby taking the discourse on education for peace, sustainable development and global citizenship beyond academia, civil society organisations and governments, to the actual stakeholders.

Flagship Campaigns and Initiatives

#KindnessMatters 
The #KindnessMatters for the Sustainable Development Goals Campaign was launched on October 2, 2018 (United Nations' International Day of Peace). The campaign aims to mobilize the world’s youth to achieve the 17 Sustainable Development Goals through transformative acts of kindness, thereby creating a positive culture of kindness, in which every young person's selfless act matters.

The International Science and Evidence based Education (ISEE) Assessment 
The International Science and Evidence based Education (ISEE) Assessment contributes to re-envisioning the future of education and feeds into UNESCO's Futures of Education report. The ISEE Assessment pools expertise on education in an open and inclusive manner and produce a scientifically robust and evidence-based assessment that can inform education policymaking at all levels and scales.

External links
MGIEP website
FramerSpace
The Blue DOT
Climate Change Course
The Digital Teacher Course
Self-directed Emotional Learning for Empathy and Kindness (SEEK)
The International Science and Evidence based Education (ISEE) Assessment

References

UNESCO
Educational organisations based in India